Bronx Community Board 10 is a local government unit of the New York City borough of the Bronx, encompassing the neighborhoods of City Island, Co-op City, Pelham Bay, Throggs Neck and Westchester Square. It is delimited by the Hutchinson River and Pelham Bay Park to the east, New England Thruway, Hutchinson River Parkway, and Westchester Creek to the west, the Bronx/Westchester County Line to the north and the East River to the south.

Community board staff and membership
The current chairperson of the Bronx Community Board 10 is Joseph Russo. Its District Manager is Matthew Cruz. Cruz is the 4th District Manager in the Board's history and the first of Latino descent.

The City Council members representing the community district are non-voting, ex officio board members. The council members and their council districts are:
 12th NYC Council District - Kevin Riley (politician)
 13th NYC Council District - Marjorie Velazquez
 18th NYC Council District - Amanda Farias

Demographics
As of the United States 2000 Census, the Community Board has a population of 115,948, up from 108,093 in 1990 and 106,516 in 1980.
Of them, 22,754 (19.6%) are Black, 56,063 (48.4%) are White, non-Hispanic, 3,462 (3%) are Asian or Pacific Islander, 164 (0.1%) American Indian or Alaska Native, 525 (0.5%) are some other race, and 2,172 (1.9%) of two or more races. 30,808 (26.6%) are of Hispanic origin.

References

External links
  
 
 

Community boards of the Bronx
Co-op City, Bronx
Throggs Neck, Bronx
City Island, Bronx